Dancing the Dream is a 1992 book of poems and reflections written by American singer and recording artist Michael Jackson, his second book following his 1988 autobiography Moonwalk. The book also contains an assortment of around 100 photographs of Jackson.

Dancing the Dream was published by Doubleday on June 18, 1992, seven months after the release of Jackson's 1991 Dangerous album. It was not a significant commercial success. The book was reissued by the British publisher Transworld on July 27, 2009, following Jackson's death the previous month on June 25, 2009.

Content
Jackson dedicated Dancing the Dream "with love" to his mother Katherine, and has an introduction written by his longtime friend Elizabeth Taylor.

The volume consists of 46 pieces of poetry and essays. The subjects Jackson writes about are primarily children, animals and the environment. For example, one specific poem titled "Look Again, Baby Seal" promotes environmentalism as Jackson imagines anthropomorphic seals who brood about the fate of being killed by hunters. Another poem ("So the Elephants March") presents elephants that refuse to be killed in order for ivory pieces to be made from their tusks. A third piece ("Mother Earth") describes a struggle to cope with the discovery of an oil-covered seagull feather. To stress the theme of environmentalism and the necessity for action, Jackson writes in the essay, "We've been treating Mother Earth the way some people treat a rental apartment. Just trash it and move on."

Jackson also writes about the degree to which the 1990 death of the AIDS sufferer Ryan White affected him in a poem titled after the youth, and as he presents in the poem, Jackson believes the teenage boy suffered through general ignorance of the disease. The poem "Mother" was written for his mother Katherine, whom Jackson loved deeply. In one stanza Jackson writes, "No matter where I go from here/You're in my heart, mother dear." The poem had previously been published by his mother in her 1990 autobiography My Family, and was not the only material in Dancing the Dream to have appeared elsewhere. The poems "Dancing the Dream" (titled as "The Dance") and "Planet Earth" were included in the sleeve notes for Jackson's 1991 Dangerous album (and in its 2001 special edition re-release). Furthermore, the lyrics to the songs "Will You Be There" and "Heal the World" — also from the 1991 album — were included in Dancing the Dream. A spoken version of the poem "Planet Earth" appeared on the 2009 posthumous album This Is It.

Dancing the Dream includes approximately 100 photographs. Although the volume was promoted to include previously unreleased photographs of Jackson, some of the photographs had been previously published, such as those that were published in the 1985 Jackson calendar, and others that had been published in magazines such as Ebony and People. Furthermore, the volume included photographs converted from stills of Jackson's music videos "Black or White" (1991) and "Remember the Time" (1992), in addition to images of his 1991 performance at MTV's tenth anniversary celebration. Jackson commissioned artwork for Dancing the Dream from Nate Giorgio and David Nordahl, whom Jackson met in the 1980s and with whom he subsequently developed a professional relationship.

Publication history
Dancing the Dream was first published on June 18, 1992, by Doubleday. It followed Jackson's 1988 autobiography Moonwalk, which was also published by the American company. Prior to publication, Dancing the Dream was hailed by the publishers as a book that would "take us deep into [Jackson's] heart and soul", as well as "an inspirational and passionate volume of unparalleled humanity". In his only interview to promote Dancing the Dream, Jackson described the book as being "just a verbal expression of what I usually express through my music and my dance." After his death on June 25, 2009, the British company Transworld reissued the book the following month on July 27, 2009.

A representative for Doubleday (Marly Rusoff) revealed in March 1993 that the company shipped 133,000 copies of the book, and took around 80,000 returns and 3000 reorders. Thus, the project was close to 60% down in total sales. Rusoff stated that the commercial performance of Dancing the Dream was low because an anticipated Jackson tour of the United States never occurred. He commented, "The reviews—and there were some—were rather discouraging. He did do a Europe tour and the British edition did quite well. This kind of book depends on celebrity visibility."

Suzanne Mantell of Publishers Weekly listed Jackson's book as one among several that "were published with great hype and hope, and [fell] far short of the publisher's expectations ... Using the rule of thumb that hardcover returns in the 20% to 30% range are acceptable, in the 30% to 50% range very high, and 50% or more a disaster, most of [the books listed] performed poorly, even if they somehow managed to recoup their costs and even make an impact on the bottom line." Mantell felt that Dancing the Dream did not create the "important buzz that gives a book a life and saves it from cultural oblivion ... Jackson may draw an audience of 65 million when he appears on Oprah, but the consensus among booksellers is that bookbuyers don't care, and that this one was a dog."

During a Simulchat in 1995, Jackson stated, "I wrote a book called Dancing the Dream. It was more autobiographical than Moonwalk, which I did with Mrs. Onassis. It wasn't full of gossip and scandal and all that trash that people write, so I don't think people paid much attention to it, but it came from my heart. It was essays, thoughts and things that I've thought about while on tour."

Poems

Notes

References

Working references

External links

 Michael Jackson's official website
 David Nordahl's official website
 Nate Giorgio's official website
 Official Michael Jackson products for sale

Works about Michael Jackson
1992 poetry books
1992 non-fiction books
American poetry collections
Books by Michael Jackson
Doubleday (publisher) books
Photographic collections and books
African-American poetry